The Journal of Mining and Metallurgy, Section B: Metallurgy is a biannual peer-reviewed scientific journal that covers mining and metallurgy. The editor-in-chief is Dragana Živković (University of Belgrade). Publishing formats include original research articles, review articles, short notices, letters, and book reviews.

Abstracting and indexing 
The journal is abstracted and indexed in:

According to the Journal Citation Reports, the journal has a 2012 impact factor of 1.435, ranking it 12th out of 75 journals in the category "Metallurgy & Metallurgical Engineering".

References

External links 
 

University of Belgrade academic journals
Mining journals
Publications established in 1965
Metallurgy
Biannual journals
English-language journals
Open access journals